Kevin Mitchell (born June 5, 1980) is an American professional ice hockey defenseman currently playing with the Nikko Icebucks in the Asia League Ice Hockey (AL). He was originally selected by the Calgary Flames in the 9th round (234th overall) of the 1998 NHL Entry Draft.

Mitchell played with EC VSV in the Austrian Hockey League during the 2010–11 Austrian Hockey League season.

After a season with Ritten-Renon in the Italian Serie A, Mitchell left as a free agent and signed a one-year contract with Swedish club, Mora IK of the HockeyAllsvenskan on June 20, 2013.

Mitchell recorded an impressive debut season from the blueline with Mora and was signed to a one-year contract extension on March 23, 2014. For the 2014–15 season, he was selected as team captain for Mora IK and responded with beating his previously scoring pace from the blueline, amassing 48 points in just 52 games.

On February 7, 2015, Mitchell signed a one-year contract to return to the familiar Austrian EBEL, in agreeing as a free agent with the Graz 99ers.

Career statistics

References

External links

1980 births
Living people
American men's ice hockey defensemen
Bridgeport Sound Tigers players
Cleveland Barons (2001–2006) players
Graz 99ers players
Guelph Storm players
Hamburg Freezers players
Hamilton Bulldogs (AHL) players
Houston Aeros (1994–2013) players
Ice hockey players from New York (state)
Iserlohn Roosters players
Louisiana IceGators (ECHL) players
Mora IK players
HDD Olimpija Ljubljana players
Oshawa Generals players
HC Dynamo Pardubice players
SC Rapperswil-Jona Lakers players
Vienna Capitals players
EC VSV players
Nikkō Ice Bucks players
Calgary Flames draft picks
American expatriate ice hockey players in Italy
American expatriate ice hockey players in Canada
American expatriate ice hockey players in Germany
American expatriate ice hockey players in Austria
American expatriate ice hockey players in Slovenia
American expatriate ice hockey players in Switzerland
American expatriate ice hockey players in the Czech Republic
American expatriate ice hockey players in Sweden
American expatriate ice hockey players in Japan